Kobun could refer to:

The original Japanese name of Servbot, an advertising character for video game developer Capcom
Emperor Kōbun, the 39th emperor of Japan from the 7th century
Kōbun (period), a chronological timeframe concurrent with the reign of Emperor Kōbun.
Kōbun Chino Otogawa, a Japanese Sōtō Zen priest.
Kōbun Shizuno, Japanese anime film and television director